Wetherbee is a surname, a variant of Weathersby. Notable people with the surname include:

Emily Greene Wetherbee (1839-1897), American poet, author and educator
Fritz Wetherbee (born 1936), American writer and television host
George Faulkner Wetherbee (1851–1920), American painter
Jim Wetherbee (born 1952), American astronaut

References